Finance and Revenue Football Club (often shortened as F&R FC), currently known as Mountain Lion FC, and formerly known as Rangoon Customs, is a Burmese professional football club operated by the Ministry of Finance and Revenue of Myanmar. The club is the most successful club in the history of the now defunct Burmese top-division football league. They won a total of 17 Burma First Division championships prior to 1996, and 9 Myanmar Premier League championships between 1996 and 2008. The club completed its dominance in the last edition of First Division football in 2009 by winning the Myanmar Premier League Cup 2009.

F&R's long presence in top division Burmese football has come to an end in April 2009 as the country's first ever professional league, the Myanmar National League, does not include any football clubs run by government ministries. In April 2009, the club released 17 of its players to the MNL, for a transfer fee of 9.7 million kyats (US$97,000).

Name changed
Finance and Revenue changed their name to Mountain Lion FC.

History

Early year
Finance & Revenue team played in Myanmar Premier League. In 2009, MFF changed Domestic league from non Professional League to Professional League.

2018
Finance & Revenue changed to Mountain Lion and play in 2018 National League 2.

2018 squad

Honours

Domestic
Rangoon League Championship
Champions: 1980–81, 1981–82, 1983–84
 Myanmar Premier League
Champions (9): 1996, 1997, 1999, 2000, 2002, 2003, 2004, 2005, 2006

International
  IFA Shield
Champions (1): 2004
Runners-up (1): 1929 (as Rangoon Customs)

References

External links
 MNL-2
 2018 National League 2

Football clubs in Myanmar
Association football clubs established in 1924
Myanmar Premier League clubs
1924 establishments in Burma
Financial services association football clubs